John Berrien (November 19, 1711April 22, 1772) was a farmer and merchant from Rocky Hill, New Jersey. He was appointed a justice of the New Jersey Supreme Court in 1764 and was a trustee of the College of New Jersey, now Princeton University, for eleven years.

Biography
Berrien was born in 1711 at Newtown on Long Island, now known as Elmhurst, Queens. He was the grandson of Cornelius Jansen Berrien.
Peter Berrien and Elizabeth Woodhull Edsall. He married Lady Margaret Eaton and had as their child Major John Berrien (1759–1815).

On April 21, 1772, he drowned after jumping into the Millstone River. His will divided his property equally among his wife and six children. He is buried in Princeton Cemetery.

It was from the Berrien Mansion, Rockingham, near Rocky Hill, New Jersey that General George Washington wrote his final address to the army in 1783.

References

External links

1711 births
1772 deaths
People from Rocky Hill, New Jersey
People from Elmhurst, Queens
People of colonial New Jersey
Colonial American merchants
Justices of the Supreme Court of New Jersey
Princeton University people
Burials at Princeton Cemetery